Vilnius Metro is a proposed rapid transit system in the Lithuanian capital Vilnius. Three lines are currently proposed to connect the busiest and most populous city districts. Its purpose is the relief of traffic congestion, which increased significantly in the 1990s and 2000s. In 2001 Mayor Artūras Zuokas requested international support for a feasibility study of the proposed system. The proposal was approved as part of the city's master plan by the Vilnius Municipal Council in 2002. Systra was chosen by the city as a study partner; the Scott Wilson Group conducted a public-private financing feasibility study during 2005 and 2006.

As of 2007, the project was the subject of intense debate by politicians and citizens. The concerns include cost (an estimated 890 million Euros), the possibility that vibrations would damage the historic buildings in Vilnius Old Town, and the perception that streets would be closed. The project was accepted by the Lithuanian government on a concession basis in 2014, but the Lithuanian president Dalia Grybauskaite placed a veto on the law.

In 2018 the Seimas of the Republic of Lithuania enacted a new act of metro development that went into effect on 1 January 2020. This act allows private investors to start construction of metro transit systems in Lithuania. The projects would have to be implemented by municipalities, which would be able to buy up to 50 per cent of shares of the construction companies. The projects would be developed in partnership or concession of the state and private companies.

Proposed lines
 Pilaitė-Centre
Pašilaičiai-Central station-Lazdynai (A circle line)
Justiniškės-Antakalnis

See also
Riga Metro

References

External links

 Vilnius Metro project – a non-governmental organization that is popularizing the idea of a metro in Vilnius

Rail transport in Vilnius
Underground rapid transit in Lithuania
Proposed public transport in Europe
Proposed rapid transit